Susanna and the Elders is one of several paintings on this theme executed by the Italian baroque artist Artemisia Gentileschi. This version, painted in 1649, hangs in the Moravská galerie, Brno, Czech Republic. It is signed with Gentileschi's signature, and the date, on the balustrade on the right.

Description
The painting tells the story of Susanna from the Book of Daniel; after having a bath in her garden, Susanna is blackmailed by two older men who threaten her with claims of promiscuity unless she has sex with them.

Unlike her earlier versions of the painting, Gentileschi here follows "a far more traditional interpretation", with Susanna looking heavenward as if to ask for divine assistance in fighting off the elders. The landscape is however more elaborated than most of Artemisia's works. 

Significant damage and overpainting were addressed during a restoration in 1953–54, which also determined that the canvas had been cut down on all sides.

Provenance
The painting is first documented in the collection of Brno industrialist Heinrich Gomperz in 1894 and was subsequently bequeathed to the city. It was previously ascribed to "Caracci", but was reassigned after the recovery of the signature during the 1953-54 restoration.

See also 

 Susanna and the Elders in art

References

Sources

1640s paintings
Paintings by Artemisia Gentileschi
Gentileschi